The Swan Princess: Escape from Castle Mountain, alternatively known as The Swan Princess and the Secret of the Castle in European territories, is a 1997 American animated musical-fantasy film and the first direct-to-video sequel to the 1994 animated film The Swan Princess. Directed by Richard Rich (who also directed the original), the film follows Derek and Odette's one-year anniversary of their wedding being disrupted by the actions of a wicked magician, Sir Clavius, who wants to find a magical orb, the source of the Forbidden Arts, and take over the world. The film was released on July 18, 1997. It is the only film in the series to be released by Warner Bros., with the other eight released by Sony Pictures Home Entertainment.

Plot 
One year since the events of the first film, Prince Derek and Princess Odette's anniversary is interrupted by the dangerous vandalism of Knuckles, the minion of the evil magician, Clavius. It is revealed that Clavius was the former partner in crime of the villain, Rothbart; they conquered the Forbidden Arts together until Rothbart drove Clavius underground after betraying their partnership. Now, Clavius wants to claim the magical orb of the Forbidden Arts that is located somewhere in Swan Lake castle, which has become Prince Derek and Princess Odette's new home. Clavius has Knuckles perform acts of vandalism in the kingdom that kept Prince Derek very busy and make him neglect both his wife and mother.

On Queen Uberta's fiftieth birthday, she is abducted by Clavius, who wants to use her as leverage. When Uberta's lackey, Sir Chamberlain, sends Derek the letter, stating that Uberta is captured, he sets out to rescue his mother. Meanwhile, Clavius sneaks into Swan Lake castle, where he kidnaps Odette and locks her in a tower and then goes after the orb himself. Bridget, who was once Rothbart's accomplice but has joined the side of good as she fell in love with Chamberlain, recognizes Clavius and knows that he is after the Forbidden Arts. She takes Speed, Puffin, and Jean-Bob into the catacombs under the castle where they find the orb first. After claiming the orb, they race back upstairs and free Odette. Odette knows now that Derek is heading into a trap, but Puffin cannot fly because his tail has been injured by Knuckles, so she convinces Bridget to use the orb to change her into a swan. Once transformed, Odette flies off to warn Derek. Clavius stumbles upon the remaining group and a chase ensues. Clavius eventually obtains the orb, and locks Bridget and the animals in the watery dungeon, although they later manage to escape.

Meanwhile, Princess Odette reaches Derek in time to save him from drowning in a pit of quicksand. Racing back to the castle, Odette and Derek see Clavius escaping in his hot-air balloon, from which Speed, Puffin, and Jean-Bob are secretly clinging to in the hopes of being able to regain the orb. Derek and Odette follow the balloon to Clavius' volcano lair. Knuckles tries to stop them, and after a fight, Knuckles falls into the lava pool beneath the volcano.

Clavius celebrates his regaining the Forbidden Arts again, but Derek arrives and the animals free Uberta from her prison. During the fight, Jean-Bob jumps on Clavius' head to stop him from delivering a killing blow to Derek. Unfortunately, Jean-Bob is killed when he is thrown off. Derek gets his hands on the orb, and the group rushes to escape in Clavius' balloon. Clavius tries to stop them, and during the struggle, the orb is dropped. The orb shatters, causing an eruption. Clavius dies in the resulting explosion, while everyone escapes.

Later, everyone is at Swan Lake, waiting for the moon to rise on Odette, who is waiting on the surface with Jean-Bob on her wing. When the moonlight touches Odette, she is transformed back to her human form and Jean-Bob is revived. The gang celebrates their victory and Uberta's birthday. The following day, her valet, Lord Rogers, tells Derek that a royal guest from Lincolnshire had arrived at the castle, but Derek asks Rogers to take care of it, as he wishes to spend the day with Odette. The two share a kiss, enjoying their time together alone at last.

Cast 
 Michelle Nicastro – Princess Odette
 Douglas Sills – Prince Derek
 Kenneth Cope provided the singing voice for this film's end credits version of Far Longer than Forever.
 Jake Williamson – Sir Clavius
 Michael Lanning provided the singing voice for You Gotta Love It but not on No Fear Rap.
 Christy Landers – Queen Uberta
 Donald Sage MacKay – Jean-Bob
 Doug Stone – Speed
 Steve Vinovich – Puffin
 Joseph Medrano – Lord Rogers
 James Arrington – Sir Chamberlain
 Joey Camen – Sir Knuckles
 Owen Miller – Bromley
 Rosie Mann – Bridget

Musical numbers 
 The Magic of Love
 That's What You Do for a Friend
 You Gotta Love It
 Far Longer than Forever (end credits)
 No Fear Rap

Release 
The film had a limited theatrical release on July 18, 1997 with a domestic gross of $273,644. On September 2, 1997, Warner Home Video released the film on VHS in the Warner Bros. Family Entertainment collection. In 1999, it was included in a VHS gift set released in the United Kingdom containing all three The Swan Princess movies. The DVD of the film was released in the United States by Sony Pictures Home Entertainment on August 18, 2009. In February 2004 in Europe and March 30, 2004 in the United States it was released in a DVD set containing all three The Swan Princess movies with a bonus sing-a-long disc.

Reception

On Rotten Tomatoes, Swan Princess has an aggregated score of 40% based on 5 critic reviews. Renee Longstreet of Common Sense Media have a review score of 2 out of 5 stars writing: "Charm replaced with cartoon violence in lackluster sequel."

References

External links 
 
 
 

1997 animated films
1997 films
1997 direct-to-video films
1990s fantasy adventure films
1990s musical films
American children's animated adventure films
American children's animated fantasy films
American children's animated musical films
American fantasy adventure films
American fantasy comedy films
Direct-to-video sequel films
Films directed by Richard Rich
Films scored by Lex de Azevedo
Films set in castles
Films set in the Middle Ages
Films with screenplays by Brian Nissen
Films with screenplays by Richard Rich
The Swan Princess
1990s American animated films
1990s children's animated films
1990s English-language films
American animated comedy films